Kaan Müjdeci (born 24 September 1980) is a screenwriter and film director. He is the winner of Special Jury Prize at the 71st Venice International Film Festival with his debut feature Sivas in 2014.

Career 
Born in Yozgat, Turkey, Kaan Müjdeci moved to Berlin, Germany in 2003 to study film directing. Instead, he first opened an illegal open-air cinema, then a bar, and finally, a fashion store. In parallel to all these ventures, Müjdeci continued film making. He is also at the helm of the popular Kreuzberg venue Luzia and the concept fashion store Voo.

Films 
Tag der Deutschen Einheit (Day of German Unity) - Müjdeci’s first short film, shot in 2010 in Berlin.

Jerry - Short Film. Müjdeci shot Jerry in New York in 2011. Jerry was screened within the scope of Berlinale Talent Campus of 61st Berlin International Film Festival in 2011.

Babalar ve Oğulları (Fathers and Sons) – Short Documentary. Müjdeci’s documentary Babalar ve Oğulları (Fathers and Sons), about dog fights in central Anatolia, served as a platform to write and direct his first feature film entitled SIVAS.  Babalar ve Oğulları (Fathers and Sons) was shown in Kraków Film Festival in 2012.

SIVAS – Feature debut. Shot in 2012 in Yozgat, Yerköy SIVAS was premiered in 71st Venice Film Festival, SIVAS received the Grand Jury Prize.

Iguana Tokyo - Kaan Müjdeci’s second feature Iguana Tokyo is currently in post-production. The project was presented among others in Cannes L'Atelier of Cannes Film Festival, Meetings on the Bridge of 34th Istanbul Film Festival and Cinelink 2015 of Sarajevo Film Festival.

References

1980 births
Living people